Thomas Walter Murphy VII (born September 27, 1979), also known as Tom 7 or by his YouTube handle of suckerpinch, is a computer scientist and YouTuber who is known for various computer-science and engineering projects, including an artificial intelligence to play NES games, "reverse-emulating" the NES to play SNES games, and a recut of Star Wars: Episode IV in alphabetical order. He also contributes papers to annual satirical computer science conference SIGBOVIK.

References

External links

Educational and science YouTubers
Living people
1979 births
YouTube channels launched in 2006